Oliver Pranjic (born 29 September 1994) is an Austrian footballer who plays for SV Leobendorf.

References

External links
 

Austrian footballers
Austrian Football Bundesliga players
2. Liga (Austria) players
1. Simmeringer SC players
FC Admira Wacker Mödling players
TSV Hartberg players
1994 births
Living people
SV Horn players
Association football midfielders